Dimitrios Tsiamis (born 12 January 1982 in Karditsa) is a Greek triple jumper.

He finished eighth at the 2006 IAAF World Indoor Championships in Moscow. He won the bronze medal at the 2018 European Championships in Berlin. He holds the record of national titles in triple jump, with 17 wins in the Greek indoor Championships and 11 wins in the Greek outdoor Championships.

Personal bests

Competition record

References

1982 births
Living people
Greek male triple jumpers
Olympic athletes of Greece
Athletes (track and field) at the 2008 Summer Olympics
Athletes (track and field) at the 2020 Summer Olympics
World Athletics Championships athletes for Greece
Athletes from Karditsa
Mediterranean Games silver medalists for Greece
Athletes (track and field) at the 2009 Mediterranean Games
Athletes (track and field) at the 2013 Mediterranean Games
Mediterranean Games medalists in athletics